Olmos may refer to:
Olmos District, a district  in Peru
Olmos, Peru, a populated place in Peru
Los Olmos, a town in Aragón, Spain
Olmos, Uruguay, a town in Canelones Department, Uruguay

People with the surname
Andrés de Olmos (c. 1485–1571), first European grammarian of Nahuatl, Totonac and Huasteco
Bodie Olmos (born 1975), American actor 
Carlos Chanfon Olmos (1928-2002), Mexican architect and professor
Edward James Olmos (born 1947), Mexican-American actor
Giuliana Olmos (born 1993), Mexican tennis player

See also
Olmos Park, Texas